The Jefferson Performing Arts Center is a 1,041-seat live event venue located in Jefferson Parish in Metairie, Louisiana. The venue was designed to host grand operas, musicals, symphonies, choral concerts, ballet and private or corporate events. The venue is currently managed by the Jefferson Performing Arts Society.

The $54.5 million performing arts center features an acoustically designed interior, a 51-ft. proscenium arch stage with a mechanical orchestra lift, a theatrical fly rigging system, four star-dressing rooms and six ensemble-dressing rooms. The theater inside the arts center is named after former Louisiana State Senator Ken Hollis, who helped secure funding for the theater.

See also
List of concert halls
List of music venues
List of opera houses
Theater in Louisiana

References

External links

 

Concert halls in Louisiana
Opera houses in Louisiana
Performing arts centers in Louisiana
Theatres in Louisiana
Music venues in Louisiana
Theatres completed in 2015